Marc Gicquel and Robert Lindstedt were the defending champions, but Gicquel chose not to participate that year.Robert Lindstedt partnered with Martin Damm, and won in the final over Mariusz Fyrstenberg and Marcin Matkowski, 7–5, 7–6(7–3).

Seeds

Draw

Draw

External links
Draw

Doubles